The 2015 Windows 10 400 was a NASCAR Sprint Cup Series race held on August 2, 2015, at Pocono Raceway in Long Pond, Pennsylvania. Contested over 160 laps on the 2.5 mile (4 km) triangular superspeedway, it was the 21st race of the 2015 NASCAR Sprint Cup Series season. Matt Kenseth won the race, his second of the season. Brad Keselowski finished second. Jeff Gordon finished third. Dale Earnhardt Jr. and Greg Biffle rounded out the top five.

Kyle Busch won the pole for the race, led 19 laps, was leading the race before running out of fuel on the final lap and finished 21st. Joey Logano led a race high of 97 laps before running out of fuel with three laps to go and finished 20th. The race had 18 lead changes among 13 different drivers, eight caution flag periods for 32 laps and one red flag period that lasted for 14 minutes and 32 seconds.

This was the 33rd career victory for Matt Kenseth, second of the season, first at Pocono Raceway and tenth at the track for Joe Gibbs Racing. Kenseth left Pocono trailing Kevin Harvick by 118–points in the points standings. Despite being the winning manufacturer, Toyota left Pocono trailing Chevrolet by 75–points in the manufacturer standings. But they pulled to within one–point of Ford for second in the standings.

The Windows 10 400 was carried by NBC Sports on the cable/satellite NBCSN network for the American television audience. The radio broadcast for the race was carried by the Motor Racing Network and Sirius XM NASCAR Radio.

Report

Background

Pocono Raceway (formerly Pocono International Raceway), also known as the Tricky Triangle, is a superspeedway located in the Pocono Mountains of Pennsylvania at Long Pond. It is the site of two annual NASCAR Sprint Cup Series races held just weeks apart in June and August, and one NASCAR Camping World Truck Series event in August.  Since 2013, the track is also host to a Verizon IndyCar Series race.

Pocono is one of a very few NASCAR tracks not owned by either Speedway Motorsports, Inc. or International Speedway Corporation, the dominant track owners in NASCAR. It is run by the Igdalsky siblings Brandon, Nicholas, and sister Ashley, and cousins Joseph IV and Chase Mattioli, all of whom are third-generation members of the family-owned Mattco Inc, started by Joseph II and Rose Mattioli.  Mattco also owns South Boston Speedway in South Boston, Virginia.

Outside of the NASCAR races, Pocono is used throughout the year by Sports Car Club of America (SCCA) and motorcycle clubs as well as racing schools. The triangular oval also has three separate infield sections of racetrack – North Course, East Course and South Course. Each of these infield sections use a separate portion of the tri-oval to complete the track.  During regular non-race weekends, multiple clubs can use the track by running on different infield sections.  Also some infield sections can be run in either direction, or multiple infield sections can be put together – such as running the North Course and the South Course and using the tri-oval to connect the two.

Kevin Harvick entered Pocono with a 69-point lead over Joey Logano. Dale Earnhardt Jr. entered 100 back, Jimmie Johnson entered 102 back and Martin Truex Jr. entered 109 back.

Changes to the track
This was done to eliminate the bumps that develop when the foundation for the track surface that goes over the tunnel the team haulers use to get in and out of the track settles into the ground.

Entry list
The entry list for the Windows 10 400 was released on Monday, July 27 at 11:20 a.m. Eastern time. Forty-three drivers were entered for the race. All were entered in the previous week's race at Indianapolis. There were three driver changes for this race. The No. 33 Hillman-Circle Sport LLC Chevrolet that was driven by Alex Kennedy. The Premium Motorsports duo swapped rides this weekend with Timmy Hill driving the No. 62 Chevrolet and Reed Sorenson driving the No. 98 Ford.

First practice

Qualifying

I feel like I probably gave up a little bit in Turn 1. I got a little bit tight in the center of that corner, but all-in-all it was a good lap and I’m glad we ran our fastest speed in the last round. That is what you have to do.” “Not bad,” Tony Stewart said after qualifying fifth. “ (Crew chief) Chad Johnston came over in between the practice session and qualifying and showed me some stuff where I was losing some time. That is what we focused on for qualifying and it worked.” “We were pretty good in that final round but not quite good enough to get the pole there,” said Brad Keselowski after qualifying ninth. “We were missing a little bit in one of the corners, but all-in-all a good effort. We had the fastest car in practice so I feel pretty good about that. It is similar to what we had at the Brickyard and we were really strong there but just needed a little more to win so I am optimistic about it for sure.” “We really struggled for whatever reason in Turn 1 today,” said Martin Truex Jr. after qualifying 13th “Just can’t seem to get the balance right. We were either too tight or too loose no matter what we do. Fought the same thing there, not a big deal though I think we will be okay. We’ve got plenty of time to figure it out tomorrow. We’ve got a few cars to pass, but 13th is not too bad. We did it last week.”

Qualifying results

Practice (post-qualifying)

Second practice

Final practice

Jeb Burton was forced to go to his backup car after wrecking into the inside pit road wall. Because this change took place after qualifying, he started the race from the rear of the field.

Race

First half

Start
The race was scheduled to start at 1:46 p.m., but started four minutes later when Kyle Busch led the field to the green flag. The first caution of the race flew on the fifth lap when Kasey Kahne got loose on the frontstretch coming out of turn 3, slid down the track and slammed into the inside wall lining pit road. This was in an almost identical manner to what happened to Jeb Burton in final practice the day before. “Well, first of all I couldn’t believe I was clear over here this late in the corner and then all the way to the left heading towards pit wall,” Kahne said. “Then I saw the people and I thought to myself that those guys need to take off running and get out of the way. I didn’t know. I hadn’t done anything like that before so it was kind of crazy the way it all happened.” Kahne was uninjured and he was released from the infield care center a few minutes later, but his car was damaged beyond repair and he finished dead last. The race was red-flagged to allow NASCAR to evaluate and repair the wall. After a 14-minute and 43 second delay, the red flag was withdrawn and the field continued under caution.

The race restarted on lap 10. The second caution of the race flew on lap 16. This was a scheduled competition caution after a section of the track was washed down following the previous day's ARCA race. A few cars opted not to pit and Kevin Harvick assumed the race lead. A. J. Allmendinger was tagged for an uncontrolled tire and restarted the race from the tail-end of the field.

The race restarted on lap 20. The third caution of the race flew the same lap when Harvick blew an engine in turn 3. This was his first DNF since the last year's Duck Commander 500 at Texas Motor Speedway. “"Coming off of Turn 2, I knew I had some issues and didn't realize they were going to be that big, but all in all, just really proud of my team," Harvick said. "Car was fast. You'll have days like this."

The race restarted on lap 24. The fourth caution of the race flew on lap 28 when Sam Hornish Jr. cut down a left-front tire in turn 1 and got rear-ended by Ricky Stenhouse Jr., who then slammed the wall. "Everything was happening real fast," said Stenhouse, who walked away uninjured. "I saw the 9 (Hornish) in Turn 3 run up the track and I thought he just got loose and everything was fine, but getting into Turn 1 the car in front of me ducked out at the last minute and there was the 9 sitting and I got on the brakes really hard. I think it got on the splitter, and (I) couldn't go left or right and just ran right into him. It is not a good day for us. I guess the 9 missed a shift or something and I wasn't aware of it until the 35 (Cole Whitt) or one of the other cars pulled out real quick, and there was the 9 sitting there. By the time I reacted, it was just too late and I ran right back into him." "It is one of those days," Hornish said. "I missed a shift on a restart, which wasn't any good, and then we had a tire come apart and then we got hit and then that deal right there (with Busch). Kurt was trying to hold on to it and I saw that he got it straightened back out, and it is one of those things where everything stops smoking long enough that you think he has it back under control again and then it is just wobbling around on him. Unfortunate for us, for sure. ... I love coming to Pocono and I have had some good runs here and led laps and felt like we could win races, but it just hasn't been for us this year. Hopefully that doesn't carry on to Watkins Glen next weekend."

Second quarter
The race restarted on lap 34 with defending Pocono winner Martin Truex Jr. out in front. He made his first stop on lap 39 and gave the lead to Joey Logano. Jimmie Johnson pitted from second on lap 44. Logano ducked onto pit road on lap 52 and handed the lead to Kyle Busch. He surrendered the lead to pit the next lap and handed it to teammate Denny Hamlin. Dale Earnhardt Jr. was tagged for speeding on pit road and was forced to serve a drive-through penalty. Hamlin pitted from the lead on lap 55 and handed it to Brad Keselowski. He pitted on lap 57 and handed the lead to Jeff Gordon. The No. 2 was tagged for an uncontrolled tire after colliding with his tire carrier and was forced to serve a drive-through penalty. Gordon pitted on lap 59 and handed the lead to Danica Patrick. The uncontrolled tire from the No. 2 pit stall brought out the fifth caution of the race on lap 62. She pitted under the caution and the lead cycled back to Joey Logano. Jeb Burton was tagged for speeding on pit road and restarted the race from the tail-end of the field.

The race restarted on lap 66. The sixth caution of the race flew the same lap when Kurt Busch got turned by Paul Menard and then t-boned by Sam Hornish Jr.

The race restarted on lap 72. The seventh caution of the race flew the same lap when Dale Earnhardt Jr. made contact with Cole Whitt in turn 1 and went spinning.

Second half

Halfway
The race restarted on lap 76. Busch pitted from second on lap 88 and started a round of green flag stops. Logano pitted the next lap and gave the lead to Matt Kenseth. He gave up the lead to pit the next lap and handed it to Kyle Larson. The eighth caution of the race flew on lap 91 when Alex Kennedy backed into the wall in turn 1. Clint Bowyer was caught off by the caution and pitted when pit road was closed. As a result, he restarted the race from the tail-end of the field. Larson pitted under the caution and handed the lead to Joey Logano.

The race restarted on lap 98. The field settled into a green flag run until lap 123 when Joey Logano surrendered the lead to pit. This handed the lead to Denny Hamlin. He pitted the next lap and handed the lead to David Ragan. He ducked onto pit road with 35 laps to go and handed the lead to Greg Biffle. Brett Moffitt was tagged for speeding on pit road and was forced to serve a drive-through penalty. Biffle hit pit road with 34 laps to go and handed the lead to Jeff Gordon. Casey Mears was tagged for having too many men over the wall and was forced to serve a drive-through penalty. Gordon surrendered the lead to pit with 33 laps to go and the lead cycled back to Joey Logano.

Final ten laps

Logano maintained a one-second lead over Kyle Busch with ten laps to go with a chance of being short on fuel. Ultimately, he ran out of fuel on the Long Pond Straightaway with three to go and Busch took over the lead. About a lap later, Truex ran out of fuel as well. On the last lap, Busch too ran out of fuel on the front–stretch, was passed by Matt Kenseth – who had taken the white flag 15 seconds behind Busch – in turn 2 and went on to take the checkered flag.

Post-race

Driver comments
“It feels good to get one today,” said Kenseth. “There’s nothing like wins. I never thought I’d ever win at Pocono and I never thought I’d win a fuel mileage race, so we did both today.” “I guess our numbers, from what (crew chief) Todd (Gordon) said, was good enough to make it by a half a lap,” said Joey Logano after running out of gas and finishing 20th. “I was saving fuel just to cushion it. I thought I was going to be good and then I started running out and knew we weren’t going to make it. It was tough. We did everything right today.”

After running into his tire carrier on lap 57 and serving a drive–through penalty for an uncontrolled tire that sent him back to 37th, Brad Keselowski rallied back to a runner–up finish. "The fuel came into play at the end and we were able to take care of it to bring home second, which is a very respectable day," Keselowski said. "Certainly not where we were going to finish without the fuel, but that is sometimes how it works. I think my teammate and his team did a phenomenal job. I am heartbroken for them to not win the race."

Jeff Gordon, who was running 16th with four laps to go, took advantage of the cars running out of fuel to finish third – matching his best finish of the season – in his 46th and final career start at Pocono Raceway. "I thought we were trying to get maybe 10th or 12th and all of a sudden they said, 'You're third,' and I think I was probably the most shocked person out there on the racetrack when I found that out," Gordon said after the race. "I knew cars were peeling off, but I just didn't realize that many were either running out or coming to pit road."

Teammate Dale Earnhardt Jr. was 17th with four to go and rallied to a fourth-place finish. "We've just got to work harder," he said. "Our car wasn't very good all weekend in the corner. We had a lot of balance issues we never really cured. That held us up. We weren't as good as we were here earlier this year. But still, it was a top-10, top-five car, but just barely a top-five car. I thought we had a good enough car to win here when we came here earlier in the summer, but we lost a little balance."

Race results

Race statistics
18 lead changes among 13 different drivers
8 cautions for 32 laps; 1 red flag for 14 minutes, 32 seconds
Time of race: 3 hours, 1 minute, 36 seconds
Average speed: 
Matt Kenseth took home $233,601 in winnings

Race awards
 Coors Light Pole Award: Kyle Busch (50.444)
 3M Lap Leader: Joey Logano (97 laps)
 American Ethanol Green Flag Restart Award: Joey Logano
 Duralast Brakes "Bake In The Race" Award: Kyle Busch
 Freescale "Wide Open": Dale Earnhardt Jr.
 Ingersoll Rand Power Move: Jeff Gordon (15 positions)
 MAHLE Clevite Engine Builder of the Race: Toyota Racing Development #20
 Mobil 1 Driver of the Race: Joey Logano (128.7 driver rating)
 Moog Steering and Suspension Problem Solver of The Race: Brad Keselowski (crew chief Paul Wolfe (0.674 seconds))
 NASCAR Sprint Cup Leader Bonus: No winner: rolls over to $180,000 at next event
 Sherwin-Williams Fastest Lap: Kyle Busch (Lap 77, 51.129)
 Sunoco Rookie of The Race: Matt DiBenedetto

Media

Television
NBC Sports covered the race on the television side. Rick Allen, Jeff Burton and Steve Letarte had the call in the booth for the race. Dave Burns, Mike Massaro, Marty Snider and Kelli Stavast handled pit road on the television side.

Radio
MRN had the radio call for the race, which was simulcast on Sirius XM NASCAR Radio. Joe Moore, Jeff Striegle and four time Pocono winner Rusty Wallace called the race from the booth when the field was racing down the front stretch. Dave Moody called the race from a billboard outside of turn 1 when the field was racing through turn 1. Mike Bagley called the race from a billboard outside of turn 2 when the field was racing through turn 2. Kyle Rickey called the race from a billboard outside of turn 3 when the field was racing through turn 3. Woody Cain, Glenn Jarrett and Steve Post worked pit road on the radio side.

Standings after the race

Drivers' Championship standings

Manufacturers' Championship standings

Note: Only the first sixteen positions are included for the driver standings.

Notes

References

Windows 10 400
Windows 10 400
NASCAR races at Pocono Raceway
Windows 10